Victor Frederick "Vic" Snyder (born September 27, 1947) is an American physician, lawyer, and politician who was the U.S. representative for  from 1997 to 2011. He is a member of the Democratic Party. He served in the United States Marine Corps during the Vietnam War at the rank of corporal.

Early life, education and career
Vic Snyder was born in Medford, Oregon. He is a graduate of Medford High School (1965) and attended college at Willamette University in Salem, Oregon, where he was a member of Kappa Sigma. In 1967, after two years of college, Snyder volunteered for the United States Marine Corps. He served in South Vietnam with Headquarters Company of the US 1st Marine Division during the Vietnam War. He served for two years and attained the rank of corporal. Snyder earned a degree in Chemistry in 1975 from Willamette and earned his M.D. degree from the University of Oregon Health Sciences Center (now Oregon Health & Science University) in Portland, Oregon in 1979.

Snyder moved to Little Rock, Arkansas and served his residency at the University of Arkansas for Medical Sciences. In 1982 after completing his residency he worked as a family practice physician for 15 years. During this time he travelled overseas to volunteer his medical services at Cambodian refugee camps in Thailand, Salvadoran refugee camps in Honduras, and Ethiopian refugee camps in Sudan. From 1985 to 1988 Snyder attended the University of Arkansas at Little Rock School of Law to obtain his J.D. degree while still maintaining his medical practice.

Arkansas Legislature
In 1990, Snyder successfully ran for a seat in the Arkansas legislature and served in that body until 1996. In the Arkansas legislature, Snyder stepped into one of his earliest legislative controversies when he attempted to repeal the state's aged "Sodomy Laws". Ultimately, however, his efforts failed, and the sodomy laws stayed in effect until the state Supreme Court struck it down in Jegley v. Picado in March 2001.

U.S. House of Representatives

Committee assignments
Committee on Armed Services
Subcommittee on Oversight and Investigations (Chairman)
Subcommittee on Military Personnel
Committee on Veterans' Affairs
Subcommittee on Health
Joint Economic Committee

Snyder focuses on many traditionally liberal issues, including a particular interest in support for veteran's and military families. He has a fairly liberal voting record for being an elected politician from the South and otherwise conservative-leaning Arkansas. Snyder voted against the Federal Marriage Amendment, the ban on partial-birth abortions, banning lawsuits against gun manufacturers and distributors, bankruptcy reform, drilling in ANWR, and on October 10, 2002, he was among the 133 members of the House who voted against authorizing the invasion of Iraq. In addition, Snyder was one of only two Congressmen to vote against prosecuting Saddam Hussein.

On issues of free and expanded trade, Snyder differs with his party, especially his Southern populist colleagues. He has also opposed legislation cracking down on Wal-Mart, which is headquartered in Bentonville, Arkansas.

Political campaigns

Snyder was elected to the U.S. House of Representatives in 1996 and was reelected in 1998, 2000, 2002, 2004, 2006 and 2008.

Snyder announced on January 15, 2010 that he would retire at the conclusion of his term which ends in 2010. A SurveyUSA poll released January 15, 2010 showed him trailing his Republican challenger, Tim Griffin, by 17 points.

During the 2008 presidential campaign, like most Arkansas Democrats, Snyder endorsed former U.S. Senator and former First Lady of Arkansas Hillary Clinton (D-New York) for President.

Electoral history

Personal life
Snyder, in 2003 married The Reverend Betsy Singleton, then a United Methodist minister at Little Rock's Quapaw Quarter United Methodist Church. They have four children, all boys, named Penn, Aubrey, Wyatt, and Sullivan. The latter three are triplets.

References

External links

 
Kappa Sigma Famous Alumni

1947 births
20th-century Methodists
21st-century American politicians
21st-century Methodists
American primary care physicians
American United Methodists
Democratic Party Arkansas state senators
Democratic Party members of the United States House of Representatives from Arkansas
Family physicians
Living people
Oregon Health & Science University alumni
Politicians from Little Rock, Arkansas
Politicians from Medford, Oregon
United States Marine Corps personnel of the Vietnam War
United States Marine Corps non-commissioned officers
Willamette University alumni
William H. Bowen School of Law alumni